Moussa Said (born 2 October 1938) is an Ethiopian sprinter. He competed in the men's 400 metres at the 1960 Summer Olympics.

References

External links
 

1938 births
Living people
Athletes (track and field) at the 1960 Summer Olympics
Ethiopian male sprinters
Ethiopian male middle-distance runners
Olympic athletes of Ethiopia
Place of birth missing (living people)
20th-century Ethiopian people
21st-century Ethiopian people